The black-throated antbird (Myrmophylax atrothorax) is a species of passerine bird in the family Thamnophilidae. It is the only species in the genus Myrmophylax. It is found in Bolivia, Brazil, Colombia, Ecuador, French Guiana, Guyana, Peru, Suriname, and Venezuela. Its natural habitats are subtropical or tropical moist lowland forests and heavily degraded former forest.

Taxonomy
The black-throated antbird was described by the French polymath Georges-Louis Leclerc, Comte de Buffon in his Histoire Naturelle des Oiseaux in 1779. The bird was also illustrated in a hand-coloured plate engraved by François-Nicolas Martinet in the Planches Enluminées D'Histoire Naturelle which was produced under the supervision of Edme-Louis Daubenton to accompany Buffon's text.  Neither the plate caption nor Buffon's description included a scientific name but in 1783 the Dutch naturalist Pieter Boddaert coined the binomial name Formicarius attothorax in his catalogue of the Planches Enluminées. The species name is an error, the correct spelling is atrothorax. The type locality is the city of Cayenne in French Guiana.

The black-throated antbird was usually placed in the genus Myrmeciza but a molecular phylogenetic study published in 2013 found that the genus was polyphyletic. In the resulting rearrangement to create monophyletic genera the black-throated antbird was moved to the resurrected genus Myrmophylax  which had originally been introduced the American ornithologist W. E. Clyde Todd in 1927. The generic name Myrmophylax combines the Ancient Greek murmos meaning "ant" and phulax meaning "watcher" or "observer". The specific name atrothorax is from the Latin ater meaning "black" and thorax meaning "breast".

Five subspecies are recognised.
 Myrmophylax atrothorax metae (Meyer de Schauensee, 1947) – central Colombia
 Myrmophylax atrothorax atrothorax (Boddaert, 1783) – Venezuela, the Guianas and northeast Brazil
 Myrmophylax atrothorax tenebrosa (Zimmer, JT, 1932) – east Ecuador, northeast Peru and northwest Brazil
 Myrmophylax atrothorax maynana (Taczanowski, 1882) – north central Peru
 Myrmophylax atrothorax melanura (Ménétries, 1835) – east Peru, east, west Bolivia, southwest Brazil

References

External links
Image at ADW

black-throated antbird
Birds of the Amazon Basin
Birds of the Guianas
black-throated antbird
Taxonomy articles created by Polbot